Lam Ngai Tong (born 13 January 1990) is a former Macanese professional footballer who played as a defender.

Club career
After stints at Sham Shui Po and Yokohama FC Hong Kong, Lam moved to Tai Po. His time at Tai Po saw the club win the 2013–14 Hong Kong Second Division and 2015–16 Hong Kong First Division titles. However, upon the club's promotion to the Hong Kong Premier League in 2016, Lam declined to re-sign with the club in order to continue working as a physical education teacher.

In September 2016, Lee decided to resume his career at Hong Kong Second Division club Sparta Rotterdam Mutual.

On 31 July 2018, Lam confirmed to the media that he would resign his teaching post in order to return to Tai Po as a full-time professional footballer.

On 12 July 2019, Lam moved to Happy Valley.

International career
Lam was born in Macau and moved to Hong Kong in 1993. He is eligible to represent Macau or Hong Kong on the international level. He earned his first cap with Macau on 5 September 2017 in a 2–0 loss to India.

Career statistics

Club

Notes

International

References

External links
 
 Lam Ngai Tong at HKFA

1990 births
Living people
Macau footballers
Hong Kong footballers
Macau international footballers
Association football defenders
Hong Kong First Division League players
Hong Kong Premier League players
Sham Shui Po SA players
Yokohama FC Hong Kong players
Tai Po FC players
Happy Valley AA players